Prav (Правь), Yav (Явь) and Nav (Навь) are the three dimensions or qualities of the cosmos as described in the first chapter of the Book of Light and in the Book of Veles (probably a fabrication from the 19-20 century) of Slavic Native Faith (Rodnovery). Older sources mention only Nav and Yav concepts of ancient slavic cosmology, similar to Yin and Yang in Taoism, and Prav was not part of the concept.  The literal meanings of the Prav, Yav, and Nav words, are, respectively, "Right", "actuality" and "probability". They are also symbolised as a unity by the god Triglav (the "Three-Headed One").  Already Ebbo (c. 775 – 20 March 851, who was archbishop of Reims) documented that the Triglav was seen as embodying the connection and mediation between Heaven, Earth and the underworld / humanity; these three dimensions were also respectively associated to the colours white, green and black as documented by Karel Jaromír Erben.

General meaning

Following the description in the Book of Veles, many modern practitioners of Slavic Native Faith describe Prav ("Right"; cf. Greek Orthotes, Sanskrit Ṛta) as being the universal order otherwise described as the "Law of Heaven", which is enacted by the supreme God (Род Rod, "Generation" itself in Slavic theology) and permeates and regulates the other two hypostases. It is conceived as being at the same time the plane of gods, who generate entities in accordance with the supreme order; gods and the entities that they beget "make up" the great God. Yav ("actuality") is believed to be the plane of matter and appearance, the here and now in which things appear in light, coalesce, but also dissolve in contingency; Nav ("probability") is held to be the world of human ancestors, of spirit, consisting in the memory of the past and the projection of the future, that is to say the continuity of time.

Descriptions

Triglav: soul, flesh and power
Represented as Triglav the three worlds are traditionally associated, respectively, to the three gods Svarog ("Heaven"), Perun ("Thunder") and Dažbog ("Sun") or Svarog, Perun, and Svetovid ("Sacred Lord") or Veles ("Underworld"). These three gods are also seen, respectively, as representing the qualities of soul, flesh and power. Perun and Svetovid are regarded as manifestations of the same Svarog, and other names for them are Dazhbog ("Giving God", "Day God") and Svarozhich (the god of fire, literally meaning "Son of Heaven"). The netherworld (Nav), especially in its dark aspect, is also traditionally embodied by Veles, who in this function is the god of waters but also the one who guides athwart them (cf. Sanskrit Varuna).

In his study of Slavic cosmology, Jiří Dynda (2014), identifies Triglav as a conception of the axis mundi, and compares it to similar concepts from other Indo-European cultures. He gives weight to the Triglav as a representation of what Georges Dumézil studied as the "Indo-European trifunctional hypothesis" (holy, martial and economic functions reflected by three human types and social classes).

The Triglav may also represents the interweaving of the three dimensions of time, metaphorically represented as a three-threaded rope. By Ebbo's words, the Triglav is definable as summus deus, the god representing the "sum" of the three dimensions of reality as a mountain or tree (themselves symbols of the axis mundi). According to Dynda, this threefold vision originating in Proto-Indo-European religion was also elaborated in early and medieval Christianity giving rise to the theology of God who is at the same time creator (father), creature (son) and creating activity (spirit).

Heaven, Earth and humanity in "genotheism"
In her theological commentaries to the Book of Veles, the Ukrainian Rodnover leader Halyna Lozko emphasises the cosmological unity of the three planes of Heaven, Earth and humanity between them. She gives a definition of Rodnover theology and cosmology as "genotheism". God, hierarchically manifesting as different hypostases, a multiplicity of gods emerging from the all-pervading force Svarog, is genetically (rodovid) linked to humanity. On the human plane God is incarnated by the progenitors/ancestors and the kin lineage, in the Earth. Ethics and morality ultimately stem from this cosmology, as harmony with nature is possible only in the relationship between an ethnic group and its own land. The same vision of a genetic essence of divinity is called "rodotheism" by the Rodnover denomination of the Ynglists.

The worship of human progenitors, such as the alleged forefather of the Slavs and Aryans "Or" or "Oryi", or local forefathers such as "Dingling" worshipped by Vladivostok Rodnovers, is common. Divine ancestors are believed to be the spirits who both kin and generators and holders together of kinship.  The Russian volkhv and neo-Nazi leader Alexey Dobrovolsky (also known as Dobroslav) emphasised the importance of blood heritage, claiming that the violation of kinship purity brings about the loss of the relationship with the kin's divine ancestor.

See also
 Nav (Slavic folklore)
 Triglav (mythology)

References

Footnotes

Sources
 
 
 
 
 
 
 
 
 
 
 

Slavic neopaganism
Modern pagan theology